Everswinkel is a municipality in Warendorf District, North Rhine-Westphalia, Germany. It is situated some 30 km north of Hamm and 15 km east of Münster.

References